The 2009 MTV Video Music Brazil was hosted by Marcelo Adnet and took place at the Credicard Hall. It awarded the best in Brazilian music, popular culture and internet culture in the year of 2009. Despite being a Brazilian awards show, the 2009 VMB included live performances by American rapper Ja Rule (in duet with Brazilian pop singer Wanessa) and Scottish rock band Franz Ferdinand, who were also nominated in the Best International Act category (but lost to Britney Spears). The 2009 VMB had over 20 categories, the largest number in the history of the show; therefore, part of the awards were delivered in a special show named "VMB Antes" ("VMB Before"), presented some hours before the main event, including small performances by the 2009 VMB Dream Band winners (the last year where the Dream Band category was maintained; in 2010 the category was extinguished) and winners in other categories.

Nominations
Winners are in bold text.

Act of the Year
Fresno
Jota Quest
Mallu Magalhães
Marcelo D2
Nando Reis
NX Zero
Paralamas do Sucesso
Pitty
Seu Jorge
Skank

Video of the Year
Black Drawing Chalks — "My Favorite Way"
Cachorro Grande — "Dance Agora"
Emicida — "Triunfo"
Jupiter Apple — "Modern Kid"
Mallu Magalhães — "Vanguart"
Nando Reis — "Ainda Não Passou"
Nervoso e os Calmantes — "Eu Que Não Estou Mais Aqui"
O Rappa — "Súplica Cearense"
Pública — "Casa Abandonada"
Skank — "Sutilmente"

Hit of the Year
NX Zero — "Cartas para Você"
Pitty — "Me Adora"
Seu Jorge — "Burguesinha"
Skank — "Sutilmente"
Wanessa (featuring Ja Rule) — "Fly"

Best New Act
Banda Cine
Copacabana Club
Garotas Suecas
Glória
Little Joy

Best International Act
Arctic Monkeys
Beyoncé
The Black Eyed Peas
Britney Spears
Franz Ferdinand
Green Day
Katy Perry
Kings of Leon
Lady Gaga
Lily Allen

MTV Bet
Black Drawing Chalks
Emicida
Holger
Mickey Gang
Vivendo do Ócio

Best Pop
Fresno
Jota Quest
Nando Reis
Skank
Wanessa

Best Rock
Autoramas
Cachorro Grande
Forfun
Pitty
Strike

Best Alternative Rock
Black Drawing Chalks
Holger
Móveis Coloniais de Acaju
Nervosos e Os Calmantes
Pública

Best Hardcore
Dead Fish (band)
Devotos
Garage Fuzz
Mukeka Di Rato
Presto?

Best MPB
Cérebro Eletrônico
Céu
Curumin
Fernanda Takai
Tiê

Best Samba
Arlindo Cruz
Casuarina
Diogo Nogueira
Mariana Aydar
Zeca Pagodinho

Best Reggae
Chimarruts
Jimmy Luv
Lei Di Dai
Natiruts
Planta e Raiz

Best Rap
Emicida
Kamau
MV Bill
Relatos da Invasão
RZO

Best Instrumental
Eu serei a Hiena
Hurtmold
Macaco Bong
Pata de Elefante
Retrofoguetes

Best Electronic
Boss in Drama
Database
Mixhell
N.A.S.A.
The Twelves

Best Live Act
Arlindo Cruz
Little Joy
Marcelo Camelo
Móveis Coloniais de Acaju
Paralamas do Sucesso

Best Musical Documentary or Movie
Coração Vagabundo
Dub Echoes
Loki
Simonal - Ninguém Sabe o Duro que Dei
Titãs - A Vida Até Parece Uma Festa

Web Hit of the Year
Caetano Caindo
Funk do Joel Santana
Os Seminovos — "Escolha Já Seu Nerd"
Stefhany — "Crossfox"
Xuxu — "Pantera Cor-de-rosa"

Blog of the Year
Brainstorm 9
Blog do Juca Kfouri
Jovem Nerd
Papel Pop
Sedentário & Hiperativo

Twitter of the Year
Danilo Gentili
Mano Menezes
Marcos Mion
MariMoon
Tessália Serighelli

Game of the Year
Braid
Fallout 3
LittleBigPlanet
The Beatles: Rock Band
The Sims 3

Dream Band
 Vocals: Lucas Silveira (Fresno)
 Guitar: Martin Mendonça (Pitty)
 Bass: Rodrigo Tavares (Fresno)
 Drums: Duda Machado (Pitty)

Performances
 Móveis Coloniais de Acaju — "O Tempo"
 Erasmo Carlos (featuring Nervoso, Gabriel Thomaz and Érika Martins) — "Cover"/"É Proibido Fumar"
 Wanessa (featuring Ja Rule) — "Fly"
 Massacration (featuring Falcão) — "The Mummy"
 Vivendo do Ócio — "Fora Mônica"
 Pitty — "Me Adora"
 Franz Ferdinand — "No You Girls"

References

MTV Video Music Brazil